Marc Yu  (born January 5, 1999, in Monterey Park, California) is an American musician and former musical child prodigy, who is best known for playing the piano and the cello.

Early life and Career
Marc started playing the piano since the age of two and a half, and the cello at the age of six. At the age of three while at a friend's party, Marc heard the children in attendance singing "[Mary Had a Little Lamb]", at which point he went over to the nearby piano and played the song back. He began undertaking formal lessons later that year. Marc has perfect pitch.

Marc exhibited prodigiousness in academic subjects, and advanced to high school-level math at the age of seven. In 2005 he was awarded a Davidson Fellow scholarship, making him the youngest recipient of the bottom-tier award. 

He has been featured on The Tonight Show with Jay Leno, The Ellen DeGeneres Show (in which he received an accordion), as well as being the focus of a National Geographic special titled "My Brilliant Brain" (USA title: "Brain Child").

His musical idol is famous Chinese pianist Lang Lang. They have performed publicly together twice to date. Marc made his Proms debut with Lang Lang in London on 31 August 2008. They performed Schubert's Fantasia in F minor for piano duet, D940. Marc made his Carnegie Hall debut on October 27, 2009, when he again performed the Schubert Fantasia with Lang Lang.

He was homeschooled by his mother, who over the years taught him English, Mandarin, and Cantonese Chinese, including Chinese calligraphy.

Marc lived in San Francisco with his family and attended The Nueva School.

Currently, Marc is majoring in film scoring at the Berklee College of Music.

References
http://articles.latimes.com/2005/jun/22/local/me-prodigy22/2

21st-century classical pianists
Child classical musicians
American child musicians
American classical pianists
Male classical pianists
American male pianists
American people of Chinese descent
Musicians from Pasadena, California
1999 births
Living people
21st-century American pianists
Nueva School alumni
21st-century American male musicians